Orthodox Jewish student groups exist at many secular colleges and universities in the diaspora, especially in the United States, Canada, and Europe.

History
At some points in history there were umbrella organization that united Orthodox students and communities in North America (Yavneh in the 1960s-1980s, Kedma in the 1990s, the Orthodox Campus Coalition in the 2000s), but they are now defunct (similar to Conservative Jewry's Koach and Reform Jewry's KESHER). The Orthodox Union and its programs Heart to Heart and JLIC have worked to revive such a structure from 2010 through 2015, and now offer a network and website of resources called Kahal.

Orthodox student groups cater to the needs of their communities, which may vary based on size, the percentage of students who commute or live on campus, and demand for religious services. The services they provide include (but are not limited to) prayer services, Torah study, kosher dining, charity work, and social events. These efforts can help to mainstream Orthodox students who would otherwise be forced either to commute and live at home or to attend a university designed for an Orthodox student population such as Yeshiva University, Touro College, or Hebrew Theological College.

To support Orthodox students and communities, the Orthodox Union created the Jewish Learning Initiative on Campus (JLIC) at many colleges. A rabbi and rebbetzin live on campus and provides classes for the students in an Orthodox setting, in conjunction with the Hillel.

Orthodox students may also be involved with Hillel or Chabad on Campus, though a Hillel or Chabad house at a university does not necessarily mean that Orthodox students attend the university.

Secular United States universities and colleges with Orthodox Jewish organizations

Secular Canadian universities and colleges with Orthodox Jewish organizations

McGill University
University of Guelph
University of Toronto
York University
Toronto Metropolitan University

Secular United Kingdom universities and colleges with Orthodox Jewish organizations
King's College London
University College London
University of Birmingham
University of Cambridge
University of Leeds
University of Manchester
University of Nottingham
University of Oxford
University of Liverpool
University of Bristol

See also
 Orthodox Union (OU)
 National Conference of Synagogue Youth, the youth arm of the OU
 Masorti on Campus, the college outreach arm of Conservative Judaism
 KESHER, the college outreach arm of Reform Judaism
 Chabad on Campus International Foundation

References

External links
 Kahal: Religious Jews in college

Orthodox Judaism
Orthodox Jewish outreach
Student societies in the United States
Student religious organizations in the United States